The  Directorate General of Cinematography and Theatre (DGCT) was a department of the Francoist dictatorship with the rank of directorate-general charged with the control of cinema and theatre in Spain, including the scope of censorship.

History 
The body was created in 1946, by means of the development of a decree from 31 December 1945. Gabriel García Espina was the first leader of the new directorate general.

In the wake of the administrative restructuring of 1951, several areas were removed from the ministerial department of National Education, as the aptitude of incoming minister Joaquín Ruiz-Giménez as censor was put into question. These areas (including the DGCT) were thus transferred to the newly-born Ministry of Information and Tourism, led by Gabriel Arias Salgado.

From 1962 onward—a period of purported "openness" during the second spell at the helm of the DGCT of —the DGCT promoted and sponsored what it came to be known as "New Spanish Cinema", even though filmmakers were not fully exempt from censorship.

The DGCT disappeared in late 1967, when it was demoted to the rank of under-directorate reportedly because of budget cuts and was subsumed within the new Directorate General of Popular Culture and Spectacles, led by Carlos Robles Piquer.

References

Bibliography 
 
 
 
 
 
Film organisations in Spain
Francoist Spain
Theatre in Spain
Organizations established in 1946
Organizations disestablished in 1967
Censorship in Spain